The Federação Paranaense de Futebol (English: Football Association of Paraná state) was founded on August 4, 1937, and it manages all the official football tournaments within the state of Paraná, which are the Campeonato Paranaense, the Campeonato Paranaense lower levels and the Copa Paraná, and represents the clubs at the Brazilian Football Confederation (CBF).

Current clubs in Brasileirão 
As of 2022 season. Common team names are noted in bold.

References

Brazilian football state federations
Football in Paraná (state)
Sports organizations established in 1937